Alain Kouyate (born 20 September 1963) is an Ivorian taekwondo practitioner. He competed in the men's featherweight at the 1988 Summer Olympics.

References

External links
 

1963 births
Living people
Place of birth unknown
Ivorian male taekwondo practitioners
Olympic taekwondo practitioners of Ivory Coast
Taekwondo practitioners at the 1988 Summer Olympics